The A 23 road is an A-Grade trunk road in Sri Lanka. It connects Wellawaya with Kumbalwela.

The A 23 passes through Ella to reach Kumbalwela.

References

Highways in Sri Lanka